Bruce Kenneth Patterson,  (born 1967) is a Canadian officer of arms at the Canadian Heraldic Authority. He was appointed Saguenay Herald in 2000, and promoted to Saint-Laurent Herald and Registrar in 2008. Since 2010 he has also been Deputy Chief Herald of Canada.

He is a graduate of the University of Trinity College (B.A.) and the University of Western Ontario (B.Ed.).

External links
Coat of Arms

1967 births
Living people
Canadian Heraldic Authority
Fellows of the Royal Heraldry Society of Canada